The Suceava Administrative Palace is a civic and historical building located at number 36 Ștefan cel Mare Street in Suceava, the seat town of Suceava County in the historical region of Bukovina, northeastern Romania.

Designed by Austrian architect Peter Paul Brang, the building features a Baroque Revival style and dates to 1903–1904, when the town was part of the Duchy of Bukovina. Initially used as a town hall, it now houses the prefecture and the Suceava County Council. It is listed as a historic monument by Romania's Ministry of Culture and Religious Affairs.

The building caught fire in 2021, causing serious damage. Subsequently, beginning in 2022, the Administrative Palace in Suceava has been undergoing rehabilitation/reconstruction works and its roof is still being renovated (as of March 2023). The renovation works will most likely finish at a later point in 2023.

Gallery

Notes 

Baroque Revival architecture in Romania
Government buildings completed in 1904
1904 establishments in Austria
Historic monuments in Suceava County
Buildings and structures in Suceava
City and town halls in Romania
Prefecture buildings in Romania